Ernocornutia pilaloana is a species of moth of the family Tortricidae. It is found in Cotopaxi Province, Ecuador.

The wingspan is 18 mm. The ground colour of the forewings is cream brown with paler areas, brown suffusions and brown dots. The hindwings are white cream with brownish strigulae (fine streaks).

References

Moths described in 2008
Euliini
Moths of South America
Taxa named by Józef Razowski